Fuck is an extended play album by American hard rock band Buckcherry, released on August 19, 2014 on F-Bomb Records. Every song on the EP has the word "Fuck" in their titles, except for the bonus track, a cover of the Aerosmith song "Mama Kin". The song "Say Fuck It" is a cover of the Icona Pop song "I Love It" with modified lyrics. It is their first release with Kelly LeMieux on bass guitar.

Track listing

Personnel
Buckcherry
Josh Todd – vocals
Keith Nelson – guitars
Stevie D – guitars
Xavier Muriel – drums
Kelly LeMieux – bass

Charts

References

Buckcherry albums
2014 EPs